"Still Goin' Down" is a song recorded by American country music singer Morgan Wallen. It was released on November 20, 2020 from his second studio album Dangerous: The Double Album. The song was co-wrote by Wallen, Hardy and Ryan Vojtesak, and produced by Joey Moi.

Content
"Still Goin' Down" is an anthem that pays tribute to all the small town Friday nights and beer drinkin' around the bonfire. Wallen described the song is all about growing up in the country, it truly is a love song to the town that raised him.

Charts

Weekly charts

Year-end charts

Certifications

References

2020 songs
Morgan Wallen songs
Songs written by Morgan Wallen
Songs written by Hardy (singer)
Song recordings produced by Joey Moi